Lars Göran Peter Adaktusson (born 6 August 1955) is a Swedish politician for the Christian Democrats. He was elected Member of the Riksdag in the 2018 general election. Prior to that, he was a Member of the European Parliament (MEP).

Early career
An employee of public broadcaster Sveriges Television (SVT) for many years, Adaktusson has worked both as a reporter and a news anchor for the nightly news show Aktuellt, and has in addition also been stationed as a foreign correspondent in Vienna, Washington DC, and in Amman.

Member of the European Parliament
Adaktusson was elected as a Member of the European Parliament (MEP) in the 2014 European Parliament elections in Sweden. He has since been serving on the Committee on Foreign Affairs (AFET) and the Subcommittee on Human Rights (DROI). In addition to his committee assignments, he serves as vice-chairman of the parliament's delegation for relations with Afghanistan.

In February 2016, Adaktusson tabled a resolution recognizing the Islamic State militant group's (ISIS) systematic killing and persecution of religious minorities in the Middle East as a genocide, which the European Parliament unanimously passed.

References

1955 births
Living people
Swedish television hosts
Christian Democrats (Sweden) MEPs
MEPs for Sweden 2014–2019
Members of the Riksdag 2018–2022
People from Jönköping
Örebro University alumni